Violetta Quesada Díaz (born July 11, 1947) is a retired sprinter from Cuba who helped win a silver medal in 4 x 100 metres relay at the 1968 Summer Olympics, the first Olympic medal ever achieved by Cuban women.

References

Sports Reference

1947 births
Living people
Cuban female sprinters
Olympic athletes of Cuba
Olympic silver medalists for Cuba
Athletes (track and field) at the 1968 Summer Olympics
Athletes (track and field) at the 1967 Pan American Games
Pan American Games medalists in athletics (track and field)
Pan American Games gold medalists for Cuba
Medalists at the 1968 Summer Olympics
Olympic silver medalists in athletics (track and field)
Medalists at the 1967 Pan American Games
Central American and Caribbean Games medalists in athletics
Olympic female sprinters
20th-century Cuban women